Bowler is a surname. Notable people with the surname include:

 Bertie Bowler, English footballer
 Bill Bowler, Canadian ice hockey player
 George Bowler, English professional footballer
 Gerry Bowler (1919–2006), Northern Irish footballer
 Grant Bowler, Australian actor
 Grant Bowler (baseball), American Major League Baseball player
 Henry Alexander Bowler (1824–1903), English painter and academic
 Holden Bowler (1912–2001), American athlete, singer and businessman who served as the namesake for Holden Caulfield in J.D. Salinger's novel The Catcher in the Rye
 J. Andrew Bowler (1862–1935), African American educator and Baptist minister
Jade Bowler (born 2000), British YouTuber known as Unjaded Jade
 James Bowler (1875–1957), American politician
 Jeff Bowler, American film and television producer
 John Bowler (disambiguation), several people
 Joseph Bowler, American artist and illustrator
 Kate Bowler, Canadian academic and writer
 Larry Bowler, Republican politician from the State of California
 Max L. Bowler (1881–1949), American businessman and politician
 Michael Bowler, English football player
 Norman Bowler, British actor
Peter Bowler (cricketer), English born Australian cricketer
 Peter Bowler (lexicographer), Australian lexicographer and author
 Peter J. Bowler, historian of biology
 Phil Bowler, American jazz double-bassist
 Shaun Bowler (born 1958), American political scientist
 Shirley D. Bowler, Louisiana Republican legislator
 Thomas William Bowler (d. 1869), British landscape painter
 Tim Bowler, English writer for young adults